Events from the year 1902 in Sweden

Incumbents
 Monarch – Oscar II
 Prime Minister – Erik Gustaf Boström

Events

 19 September - Swedish Employers Association is founded.
 Women's Trade Union  is founded.

Births

 31 January - Alva Myrdal, social democrat  (died 1986)
 11 November - Solveig Rönn-Christiansson, communist  (died 1982)
 1 September - Linde Klinckowström-von Rosen, writer and equestrian  (died 2000)

Deaths

 10 April – Pontus Fürstenberg, art collector  (born 1827)
 2 May – Jane Miller Thengberg, educator  (born 1822)
 18 September – Thorborg Rappe, social reformer  (born 1832)
 5 October – Ebba Boström, nurse and a philanthropist (born 1844)
 Adolfina Fägerstedt, ballerina (died 1811)
 Martis Karin Ersdotter, businessperson (born 1829)

References

 
Years of the 20th century in Sweden
Sweden